Faisal Rafiq is a Pakistani politician who had been a Member of the Provincial Assembly of Sindh, from April 2016 to May 2018.

Early life and education
He was born on 5 June 1975 in Karachi.

He has a Bachelor of Commerce degree from Karachi University.

Political career

He was elected to the Provincial Assembly of Sindh as a candidate of Mutahida Quami Movement from Constituency PS-115 Karachi-XXVII in by-polls held in April 2016.

References

Living people
Sindh MPAs 2013–2018
1975 births
Muttahida Qaumi Movement politicians